Walter Hyatt (October 25, 1949 – May 11, 1996) was an American singer and songwriter. His group, Uncle Walt's Band, was involved in the alternative music scene in Austin, Texas.

Early life
Born in Spartanburg, South Carolina, Walter Hyatt was exposed to different styles of music at an early age. He started playing the guitar at age 13 and formed his first band in his midteen years. Hyatt attended Wofford College for two years but left before graduation to pursue his music career.

Music career
At age 20, Hyatt formed Uncle Walt's Band with Champ Hood and David Ball. In 1972, they moved to Nashville, Tennessee, where they caught the attention of Texas singer/songwriter Willis Alan Ramsey.

The band returned to the Carolinas in 1974, recording Blame It on the Bossanova, their first record, at Arthur Smith Studios in Charlotte. A year later, Uncle Walt's Band split up, with Hyatt returning to Nashville and forming a new band, The Contenders, with Hood and Nashville musicians Steve Runkle, Tommy Goldsmith, and Jimbeau Walsh.

In 1978, Uncle Walt's Band reunited. They released three more albums on what is now considered Austin's original independent labels, Lespedeza Record Company: An American in Texas, Uncle Walt's Band Recorded Live, and Six * Twenty-Six * Seventy-Nine.

In 1987, Hyatt returned to Nashville with his wife, Heidi, and embarked on a solo career. In 1990, Hyatt became the first vocalist for MCA's Master Series label. His first solo album from this label, titled King Tears, was produced by Lyle Lovett, who had been a fan of Uncle Walt's Band. Hyatt later toured as an opening act for Lovett. In 1993, Hyatt released his second solo album, Music Town, on Sugar Hill Records.

Hyatt's Some Unfinished Business, Volume One, composed of the singer's last recordings, was released January 22, 2008.

Death
Hyatt died in the crash of ValuJet Airlines Flight 592 on May 11, 1996. He was 46. He was survived by his wife Heidi and their two children, Taylor and Rose Evelyn, and Walter's daughter Haley.

Tributes
In 1997, an episode of the PBS show Austin City Limits featured a tribute to Hyatt by Lovett, Junior Brown, Shawn Colvin, Allison Moorer, Marcia Ball, Willis Alan Ramsey, Jimmie Dale Gilmore, and Uncle Walt's Band members Rick Gordon, Champ Hood, and David Ball.

In 2008, the Austin Music Awards featured a tribute with Lovett, Ball, Champ Hood's son Warren Hood, and Champ Hood's nephew Marshall Hood of The Belleville Outfit.

References

External links
 Official website
 Austin City Limits (Lyle Lovett and Friends: A Tribute to Walter Hyatt)
 SegWay City - Hyatt article

1949 births
1996 deaths
Songwriters from South Carolina
Accidental deaths in Florida
20th-century American singers
Musicians from Spartanburg, South Carolina
Uncle Walt's Band members
20th-century American male singers
Victims of aviation accidents or incidents in 1996
Victims of aviation accidents or incidents in the United States
American male songwriters
Lyle Lovett and His Large Band members
Wofford College alumni